The 2014 Quebec Men's Provincial Curling Championship, also known as the Quebec Tankard, was held from January 11 to 19 at the Club de curling Desjardins in Val-d'Or, Quebec. The winning Jean-Michel Ménard rink from Saint-Romuald represented Quebec at the 2014 Tim Hortons Brier in Kamloops, British Columbia.

Qualification

Teams

Round-robin standings
Final round-robin standings

Round-robin results

Draw 1
Sunday, January 12, 8:15

Draw 2
Sunday, January 12, 15:00

Draw 3Monday, January 13, 8:15Draw 4Monday, January 13, 15:45Draw 5Tuesday, January 14, 12:00Draw 6Tuesday, January 14, 19:30Draw 7Wednesday, January 15, 12:00Draw 8Wednesday, January 15, 19:30Draw 9Thursday, January 16, 12:00Draw 10Thursday, January 16, 19:30Draw 11Friday, January 17, 8:15Draw 12Friday, January 17, 12:00Draw 13Friday, January 17, 15:45TiebreakerFriday, January 17, 19:30Playoffs

1 vs. 2Saturday, January 18, 18:303 vs. 4Saturday, January 18, 18:30SemifinalSunday, January 19, 8:30FinalSunday, January 19, 13:00''

External links

Quebec Men's Provincial Curling Championship
Sport in Abitibi-Témiscamingue
Curling in Quebec
Val-d'Or
2014 in Quebec